Mark Barnes (1970 – 1 January 2016), known professionally as Mark B, was a British hip hop record producer.

He was most active in the 1990s and early 2000s, associating with Task Force and Blade on many of his records. He was a DJ for Jazz Fudge Recordings for much of his career.

Mark B first signed with Jazz Fudge in 1995. He produced some tracks for DJ Vadim's U.S.S.R. Repertoire. His first individual album was Underworld Connection, released in 1997. He died in January 2016.

Discography
 Any More Questions? (1995)
 Underworld Connection (1997)
 Disco-Loated Beats & Sounds, Vol. 1 (1997)
 New Skool Dean (1998)
 Hitmen for Hire (1998)
 Nobody Relates (1998)
 Split Personalities/From the World Lab (2000)
 The Unknown (2000)
 The Unknown: The New Version (2001)
0161 relief [mark b remix] (2001)
Big Tings [Mark B remix] (2001)

References

1970 births
2016 deaths
English hip hop musicians
English DJs
English male rappers
English record producers
People from Kingston upon Thames
Rappers from London